Rosemary Sutcliff  (14 December 1920 – 23 July 1992) was an English novelist best known for children's books, especially historical fiction and retellings of myths and legends. Although she was primarily a children's author, some of her novels were specifically written for adults. In a 1986 interview she said, "I would claim that my books are for children of all ages, from nine to ninety."

For her contribution as a children's writer Sutcliff was a runner-up for the Hans Christian Andersen Medal in 1974.

Biography
Sutcliff was born 14 December 1920 to George Ernest Sutcliff and his wife Nessie Elizabeth, née Lawton, in East Clandon, Surrey. She spent her childhood in Malta and various naval bases where her father, a Royal Navy officer, was stationed. She was affected by Still's disease when she was very young, and used a wheelchair most of her life. Due to her chronic illness, Sutcliff spent most of her time with her mother from whom she learned many of the Celtic and Saxon legends that she would later expand into works of historical fiction. Sutcliff's early schooling was constantly interrupted by moving house and her illness. She did not learn to read until she was nine years of age, and left school at age 14 to enter the Bideford Art School, which she attended for three years, graduating from the General Art Course. Sutcliff then worked as a painter of miniatures.

Inspired by the children's historical novels of Geoffrey Trease, her first published book was The Chronicles of Robin Hood in 1950. In 1954, she published what remains her best-known work The Eagle of the Ninth, part of a series on Roman Britain and its aftermath; they were not written as such or in sequential order but connected by the linking device of an emerald ring, passed down through generations of the same family. Between 1954 and 1958, Sutcliff's works The Eagle of the Ninth, its sequel The Silver Branch, Outcast and Warrior Scarlet were runners-up in the annual Carnegie Medal, given by the Library Association to the year's best children's book by a British subject. She finally won the Medal for her third book in the Eagle series, The Lantern Bearers (1959). Where the first two books and one subsequent one were set in Roman Britain, The Lantern Bearers immediately follows the withdrawal of the Roman Empire, when the British people are threatened by remaining Germanic troops and by invaders.

Sutcliff was Carnegie runner-up again for her retelling of the Arthurian legend in Tristan and Iseult, which in 1971 won the American Horn Book Award. In 1985, The Mark of the Horse Lord was the inaugural winner of the Phoenix Award, created by the Children's Literature Association to recognise the best English-language children's book that did not win a major award when originally published twenty years earlier. It is named for the mythical bird phoenix, which is reborn from its ashes, to suggest the book's rise from obscurity. The Shining Company won the same award in 2010.

Sutcliff lived for many years in Walberton near Arundel, Sussex. In 1975, she was appointed an Officer of the Order of the British Empire for services to children's literature, and later Commander of the Order of the British Empire in 1992. She wrote incessantly throughout her life and was still doing so on the morning of her death in 1992. Sutcliff never married and had no children.

Books

Autobiography
 Blue Remembered Hills: A recollection (1983); Sutcliff's memoir of her childhood and young adulthood.

Other nonfiction
 Houses and History (London: Batsford, 1960), illustrated by William Stobbs
 Rudyard Kipling (1960), a monograph
 Heroes and History (1965), illus. Charles Keeping
 A Saxon Settler (People of the Past, 1965), illus. John Lawrence

Eagle of the Ninth series 
The series, also referred to as 'Marcus', is linked by the Aquila family dolphin ring and listed here in fictional chronological order. (They were not written as a series by the author.)

 The Eagle of the Ninth (1954), illus. C. Walter Hodges ‡
 The Silver Branch (1957), illus. Charles Keeping ‡
 Frontier Wolf (1980)
 The Lantern Bearers (1959)
 Sword at Sunset (1963); "officially for adults"
 Dawn Wind (1961), illus. Charles Keeping
 Sword Song (1997, posthumous)
 The Shield Ring (1956), illus. C. Walter Hodges

‡ Three Legions (1980), or Eagle of the Ninth Chronicles (2010), is an omnibus edition of the original Eagle of the Ninth trilogy (The Eagle of the Ninth, The Silver Branch and The Lantern Bearers, 1954 to 1959).

Arthurian novels
Raymond Thompson credits Sutcliff with "some of the finest contemporary recreations of the Arthurian story" and names these seven works. The first two are also part of the Eagle of the Ninth series (above) that attempt to depict Arthur as an actual historical figure.

 The Lantern Bearers (1959)
 Sword at Sunset (1963) 
 Tristan and Iseult (1971); retells the story of Tristan and Iseult
 The Arthurian Trilogy (inspired by Malory's Le Morte d'Arthur)
 The Sword and the Circle (1981), illus. Shirley Felts
 The Light Beyond the Forest (1979), illus. Shirley Felts
 The Road to Camlann (1981), illus. Shirley Felts
 The Shining Company (1990); retells the Y Gododdin story (the earliest mention of Arthur's name)

King Arthur Stories: Three Books in One (1999), or The King Arthur Trilogy (2007), is an omnibus edition of the Arthurian Trilogy (1979 to 1981).

Other children's novels
 The Chronicles of Robin Hood (Oxford, 1950), illus. C. Walter Hodges—Sutcliff's first published book
 The Queen Elizabeth Story (1950) illus. C. Walter Hodges
 The Armourer's House (1951) illus. C. Walter Hodges
 Brother Dusty-Feet (1952), illus. by C. Walter Hodges
 Simon (1953), illus. Richard Kennedy, cover art by William Stobbs; set during the 17th-century English Civil War
 Outcast (1955), illus. Richard Kennedy
 Warrior Scarlet (1958), illus. Charles Keeping
 Knight's Fee (1960), illus. Charles Keeping
 Bridge Builders (1960), illus. Douglas Relf, about the building of Hadrian's Wall. Originally published as a short story in Another Six (Another 6): Stories by Richard Armstrong, William Mayne, Noel Streatfeild, Patricia Lynch, A. Philippa Pearce, Rosemary Sutcliff. UK: Blackwell, 1959.
 Beowulf: Dragonslayer (1961) illus. Charles Keeping; retells the Beowulf story
 The Hound of Ulster (1963), illus. Victor Ambrus; retells the story of Cúchulainn
 The Mark of the Horse Lord (1965), illus. Charles Keeping;
 The Chief's Daughter (1967), illus. Victor Ambrus;
 The High Deeds of Finn MacCool (1967), illus. Michael Charleton
 A Circlet of Oak Leaves (1968), illus. Victor Ambrus
 The Witch's Brat (1970), illus. Richard Lebenson
 The Truce of the Games (1971), illus. Victor Ambrus
 Heather, Oak, and Olive (1972), illus. Victor Ambrus; a collection of three dramatic stories: "The Chief's Daughter", "A Circlet of Oak Leaves", and "A Crown of Wild Olive" (originally published as "The Truce of the Games")
 The Capricorn Bracelet (1973), illus. Charles Keeping (later, Richard Cuffari); six stories, linked by a Roman armilla (military decoration), that originated as radio scripts
 The Changeling (1974), illus. Victor Ambrus
 We Lived in Drumfyvie (1975), by Sutcliff and Margaret Lyford-Pike. "The authors combine their talents to recreate 700 years in the life of an imaginary Scottish burgh. The folk of Drumfyvie tell their own stories. "
 Blood Feud (1976), illus. Charles Keeping. Adapted as a TV movie in 1990, titled Sea Dragon.
 Sun Horse, Moon Horse (1977), illus. Shirley Felts
 Shifting Sands (1977), illus. Laslzo Acs
 Song for a Dark Queen (1978); retells the story of Queen Boudica
 Eagle's Egg (1981), illus. Victor Ambrus
 Bonnie Dundee (1983), the story of John Graham, 1st Viscount of Dundee, and the Jacobite rising of 1689
 Flame-coloured Taffeta (1986), illus. Rachel Birkett
 The Roundabout Horse (1986) illus. Alan Marks
 A Little Dog Like You (1987) illus. Jane Johnson
 The Best of Rosemary Sutcliff (1987), illus. Charles Keeping—omnibus edition of Warrior Scarlet, The Mark of the Horse Lord, and Knight's Fee (1958–1965)
 The Minstrel and the Dragon Pup (1993, posthumous), illus. by Emma Chichester Clark; also serialised in Cricket
 Black Ships Before Troy (1993, posth.), illus. Alan Lee; retells the Iliad story; also serialised in Cricket
 Chess-Dream in a Garden (1993, posth.), illus. Ralph Thompson A fantasy for children inspired by the Lewis Chessmen.
 The Wanderings of Odysseus (1995, posth.), illus. Alan Lee; retells the Odyssey story

Novels for adults 
 Lady in Waiting (1957); set in Tudor England, the story of Bess Throckmorton, wife of Sir Walter Raleigh
 The Rider of the White Horse (1959); set during the 17th-century English Civil War, about Parliamentarian general Sir Thomas Fairfax and his wife Anne who travelled on campaign with him
 Sword at Sunset (1963); set in sub-Roman Britain, a story of King Arthur as the Romano-Celtic warrior prince he may have been; part of The Eagle of the Ninth series
 The Flowers of Adonis (1969); set in ancient Greece, about the brilliant but erratic Athenian general Alkibiades and the Peloponnesian War
 Blood and Sand (1987); set during the Napoleonic Wars, based on the life of the soldier Thomas Keith.

Other works

Plays and screenplays
 The New Laird. Radio play (BBC Schools Radio series Stories from Scottish History). Broadcast 7 May 1966.
 Ghost Story. Screenplay with Stephen Weeks and Philip Norman, 1975.
 Mary Bedell. Stage play. Produced London, 1986.
 The Eagle of the Ninth. Stage play with Mary Rensten.

Articles
 "History Is People". A paper distributed at a conference on Children's Literature in Education, Exeter, England, 1971. Reprinted in Children and Literature: Views and Reviews, edited by Virginia Haviland, pp. 305–312 Scott, Foresman 1973, pp. 305–312
 "Combined Ops".  Junior Bookshelf 24 (July 1960):121–27.  Reprinted in Egoff, Only Connect: Readings on Children's Literature, 1st ed., pp. 244–48; 2d ed., pp. 284–88. Describes the process of writing Eagle of the Ninth and The Lantern Bearers.

Collected papers

In 1966 Sutcliff made a small donation to the de Grummond Children's Literature Collection at the University of Southern Mississippi in Hattiesburg, Mississippi. (In this she responded to Lena Grummond's international call for original materials to establish the Collection.) The Sutcliff Papers include a manuscript and two typescripts for the radio play The New Laird. That programme was taped 4 April 1966 and broadcast from Edinburgh on 17 May 1966 as part of the Stories from Scottish History series (BBC Radio Scotland). The collection also includes a small red composition book of research notes for The Lantern Bearers and for two unpublished works, The Amber Dolphin and The Red Dragon.

Works about Sutcliff

 Margaret Meek, Rosemary Sutcliff, New York, Henry Z. Walck, (1962), a brief biographical monograph and critical study.
 John Rowe Townsend, "Rosemary Sutcliff", a critical essay in A Sense of Story: Essays on Contemporary Writers for Children, London, Longman, 1971, pp. 193–99. Reissued as A Sounding of Storytellers (1979).
 Barbara L. Talcroft, Death of the Corn King: King and Goddess in Rosemary Sutcliff's Historical Novels for Young Adults, Metuchen, New Jersey and London: The Scarecrow Press, 1995.
 Miriam Youngerman Miller, "The Rhythm of a Tongue: Literary Dialect in Rosemary Sutcliff's Novels of the Middle Ages for Children", Children's Literature Association Quarterly 19:1, Spring 1994, pp. 25–31.
 Hilary Wright, Shadows on the Downs: Some Influences of Rudyard Kipling on Rosemary Sutcliff. Children's Literature in Education 12, No. 2:90-102 (Summer 1981)
 The Search for Selfhood: The Historical Novels of Rosemary Sutcliff. TLS : Essays and Reviews from the Times Literary Supplement, 17 June 1965, p. 498. Reprinted in Only Connect: Readings on children's literature, ed. Sheila Egoff et al. Toronto New York: Oxford University Press (Canadian Branch), 1969, pp. 249–255.
 Abby Mims, Rosemary Sutcliff in British Writers: Supplement 16. Ed. Jay Parini. Detroit: Charles Scribner's Sons, 2010. Web: Gale Literature Resource Center.

Awards
The biennial Hans Christian Andersen Award conferred by the International Board on Books for Young People is the highest recognition available to a writer or illustrator of children's books. Sutcliff was one of three runners-up for the writing award in 1974 (and the British nominee in 1968 as well).

She won several awards for particular works.

 1959 Carnegie Medal, The Lantern Bearers
 1971  (the Dutch Silver Pencil)
 1972 Boston Globe-Horn Book Award, Tristan and Iseult
 1978 The Other Award, Song for a Dark Queen
 1985 Phoenix Award, The Mark of the Horse Lord (1965)
 2010 Phoenix Award, The Shining Company (1990)

Besides winning the 1959 Carnegie Medal, Sutcliff was a commended runner-up five times. Alan Lee, who illustrated Sutcliff's posthumously published retellings of The Iliad and The Odyssey, won the companion Kate Greenaway Medal for the former, Black Ships Before Troy (1993).

See also

Notes

References

External links
  – books, TV scripts, films, TV versions and life; by her literary executor Anthony Lawton
Official Birth Centenary Blog; also by her literary executor Anthony Lawton
 
 
 
 "Rosemary Sutcliff: An Appreciation" by Sandra Garside-Neville, first published in Solander (Journal of the Historical Novel Society), No. 8, pp. 2–6, December 2000
 "Of the Minstrel Kind" by Margaret Meek, a tribute to Rosemary Sutcliff at seventy published in Books for Keeps No. 64, September 1990
 "Rosemary Sutcliff 1920–1992" at HistoricalNovels.info
 Sutcliff's Roman Britain novels reviewed by Eric Eller at The Green Man Review – provides synopses and discusses the series in the context of place and chronological setting
 Interview with Sutcliff on the Arthurian novel Sword at Sunset by Raymond H. Thompson, 1986], The Camelot Project, Robbins Library Digital Projects, University of Rochester
 "Obituary: Rosemary Sutcliff", Julia Eccleshare, The Independent, 27 July 1992

English children's writers
English fantasy writers
English historical novelists
British writers of young adult literature
Writers of modern Arthurian fiction
Carnegie Medal in Literature winners
Commanders of the Order of the British Empire
English people with disabilities
English women novelists
Women science fiction and fantasy writers
People from the Borough of Guildford
People from Walberton
20th-century English novelists
20th-century English women writers
1920 births
1992 deaths
British women short story writers
Women writers of young adult literature
Women historical novelists
Writers with disabilities
Writers of historical fiction set in antiquity
Writers of historical fiction set in the Middle Ages
Writers of historical fiction set in the early modern period